Enekbatus longistylus is a shrub endemic to Western Australia.

It blooms between September and October producing pink-violet flowers.

It is found on sand plains in the Mid West and Wheatbelt regions of Western Australia between Geraldton and Three Springs where it grows in sandy soils.

References

longistylus
Endemic flora of Western Australia
Myrtales of Australia
Rosids of Western Australia
Vulnerable flora of Australia
Plants described in 2010
Taxa named by Malcolm Eric Trudgen
Taxa named by Barbara Lynette Rye